is a Japanese gymnast and Olympic champion. He hails from Okayama City and attended the Nippon College of Physical Education (now called Nippon Sport Science University). Morisue is now a show business personality in Japan and is frequently seen on TV, especially in sports programs, and to comment on the Olympics and other international competitions. In April, 2006 he was appointed professor at Kyushu Kyoritsu University.

Olympics
He received a gold medal in horizontal bar, a silver medal in vault, and a bronze medal in team combined exercises at the 1984 Summer Olympics in Los Angeles.

World championships
Morisue received a bronze medal with the Japan team in the 1983 World Artistic Gymnastics Championships in Budapest.

Writer
In the early nineties amateur athletes have decreased. Morisue, concerned about the phenomenon of the moment, wrote the scenarios for the sports manga Ganba! Fly High, based in part on his experiences as a gymnast, for which he and the illustrator Hiroyuki Kikuta received the 1998 Shogakukan Manga Award for shōnen manga.

Filmography

References

External links
 Morisue(Parallel bars)

1957 births
Living people
Japanese male artistic gymnasts
Gymnasts at the 1984 Summer Olympics
Olympic gymnasts of Japan
Olympic gold medalists for Japan
Olympic silver medalists for Japan
Sportspeople from Okayama
Nippon Sport Science University alumni
Olympic medalists in gymnastics
Asian Games medalists in gymnastics
Gymnasts at the 1982 Asian Games
Medalists at the 1984 Summer Olympics
Medalists at the World Artistic Gymnastics Championships
Olympic bronze medalists for Japan
Asian Games silver medalists for Japan
Medalists at the 1982 Asian Games
20th-century Japanese people
21st-century Japanese people